Darling Caroline (French: Caroline Chérie) is a 1951 French historical comedy film in black and white, directed by Richard Pottier and starring Martine Carol, Jacques Dacqmine, and Marie Déa. It is based on Jacques Laurent's historical novel "The loves of Caroline Cherie: A novel". It was remade as Darling Caroline in 1968.

It was shot at the Billancourt Studios in Paris. The film's sets were designed by the art director Jacques Krauss. It was followed by two sequels Un caprice de Caroline chérie (1953) and Caroline and the Rebels (1955). While Carol reprised her role for the first film, the second starred Brigitte Bardot playing a different character.

Plot
During her birthday in France, July 1782, the beautiful young Marchioness Caroline meets the attractive soldier Gaston. It is love at first sight, but Gaston does not wish to make a commitment because a military career waits for him. Caroline marries then a politician but the French Revolution bursts and Caroline has to run away to escape the guillotine. By running away, she meets Gaston again who decides to help her.

Cast

See also
 List of historical drama films
 List of French films of 1951
 List of epic films

References

Bibliography
 Geoffrey Nowell-Smith. The Oxford History of World Cinema. Oxford University Press, 1996.

External links
 

1951 films
1950s historical comedy films
French historical comedy films
French epic films
1950s French-language films
French black-and-white films
Films based on French novels
Films scored by Georges Auric
Films directed by Richard Pottier
Films set in 1782
Films set in the 1790s
French Revolution films
Films with screenplays by Jean Anouilh
Films with screenplays by Michel Audiard
Films shot at Billancourt Studios
Gaumont Film Company films
Films based on works by Jacques Laurent
1950s French films